Trilling is a surname. Notable people with the surname include:

 Daniel Trilling, British journalist
 Ilia Trilling (1895–1947), Yiddish song composer
 Lawrence Trilling, American television director
 Lionel Trilling (1905–1975), US literary critic

See also
 Drilling